Christopher John Campbell is a British diplomat who has served on several diplomat positions in Latin America from 2011. On 13 October 2020, he was admitted as the Ambassador to Ecuador.

Consular career
Campbell joined the Foreign and Commonwealth Office in 1982 and started in the North America Department. In 1984, he moved to the Secretary of State's Private Office and the next year was placed to the UK Embassy in Khartoum as an economist. From 1988 he worked at the embassy in Dhaka and from 1992 at the embassy in Jakarta.

He served as the British Ambassador to the Dominican Republic from 2015 to 2020.

He served as the Ambassador to Nicaragua from 2011 to 2015.

He and his wife, Sharon Campbell, were the first married couple ever to be ambassadors to neighbouring countries.

On 13 October 2020, he was recognized as British Ambassador to Ecuador.

References 

Living people
Ambassadors of the United Kingdom to the Dominican Republic
Ambassadors of the United Kingdom to Ecuador
Ambassadors of the United Kingdom to Nicaragua
Year of birth missing (living people)